Moelva (old spelling: Maa Elv) is a river in the municipalities of Birkenes and Lillesand in Agder, Norway.  It originates from a hill south of Tveide in Birkenes and empties into the Tingsakerfjord, east of the town of Lillesand.  Large parts of the disused, former railway Lillesand-Flaksvand Line followed the river bank.

An old stone bridge is still located by Helvetesfossen. It was restored by the Norwegian Public Roads Administration in 1993.

Hydropower  
The hydropower company Lillesand Elektrisitetsverk was started as a private company in 1916. There were dams in all tributaries to Moelva, dam at Helvetesfossen and pipeline down to the power station at Tingsaker, that had a turbine of 150 hp, a generator of 125 kW and an oil transformer of 7 kW.  The power plant was sold and closed in 1970.

Fishing 
Moelva is a sea trout leader in the lower part. It is Lillesand municipality that has been responsible for both the preparation and clearing of the riverbed and built a threshold dam in the lower part of the river. The sea trout population has recovered after a decline due to pollution.

Gallery 
The former power plant

References 

Rivers of Agder
Birkenes
Lillesand
Rivers of Norway